Aiton is a commune in Cluj County, Transylvania, Romania. It is composed of two villages, Aiton and Rediu (Rőd).

Geography 
Mean altitude: 626 m (2054 ft).

The presence of large deposits of halite and saltwater springs within the perimeter of the commune have been identified.

History 
Traces of several ancient neolithic settlements (of which Vinča culture from the 4th millennium BC), as well as evidence indicative of the Bronze Age, the Iron Age, the Roman conquest, and the Migration Period, were discovered in the village. Within the surrounding area, a tomb of incineration from the 1st century BC and a rustic villa have also been found; the latter in which a Dacian fruit tree from the 2nd century BC has been discovered.

During the Roman period, the locality was situated on the Roman road of Potaissa-Napoca. Initially, a portion of the commune was left uncovered in the yard adjacent to the school, marked by a colonette reproducing the inscription on the milestone of 108. As of 2017, however, the site is covered in waste products. The area was historically the center of a Spanish equestrian unit.

The first documented reference to the village of Aiton with the name Villa Ohthunth dates back to 1320, and in 1329, the toponym of Ahthon was attributed to the settlement. Since 1456, it appears under the current name of Ayton. In 1658, the locality was burned, following a Turkish and Tatar invasion.

In the 18th century, a milestone named Aiton Biliar from the Roman period was discovered. This marked a distance on the Potaissa-Napoca. The landmark attests the existence of a road built in 108 AD by the cohors I hispanorum miliaria. A copy of this landmark is displayed in Turda, yet another is displayed in front of the school of Aiton.

On the Josephine Map of Transylvania from 1769 to 1773 (section 095), Aiton appears under the name of Ajton. The northern and southeastern parts of the village are marked by "Gericht" and by the sign of two public places of punishment of the delinquents in the medieval period.

Historical monuments 
The following objectives of the village of Aiton were included on the list of historical monuments in Cluj County, elaborated further by the Ministry of Culture and Religious Affairs in 2010.
 The archaeological site from "Suri" (LMI code)
 The archaeological site of "Above the Morrow" (LMI code)
 The archaeological site of the section "Between creeks" (LMI code)
 The vestiges of the Napoca-Potaissa road (LMI code)
 The wooden church (LMI code)
 Reformed Calvinist Church (LMI code)

 The "Sandor Manor" in the village of Aiton is included in the "List of Delisted Historical Monuments", as described by the Ministry of Culture and Religious Affairs in 2010.

Places of worship 
 The Reformed Calvinist Church from 1598 (Main Street no. 161), with the Romanesque western portal.  The church is inscribed on the list of historical monuments in Cluj County (2010).
 The Orthodox Wooden Church from 1711. The church is inscribed on the list of historical monuments in Cluj County (2010).
 The Wooden Church of Aiton.

Tourist attractions 
Among the main tourist attractions and points of interest in the area are as follows:
 The museum with objects from the Roman period (demolished in the meantime).
 The reservation of "Ciolt Forest".

Economy 
The predominant occupations of residents involve agriculture and the breeding of livestock.

Demographics

Ethnic demographics of population

Religious demographics of population 

The numerical jump in favor of the Orthodox between 1930 and 1992 can be explained by the prohibition of the Greek Catholic Church in 1948.

Gallery

Notes

References
Atlasul localităților județului Cluj (Cluj County Localities Atlas), Suncart Publishing House, Cluj-Napoca, 

Communes in Cluj County
Localities in Transylvania